Village of the Damned is a 1960 British science fiction horror film by Anglo-German director Wolf Rilla. The film is adapted from the novel The Midwich Cuckoos (1957) by John Wyndham. The lead role of Professor Gordon Zellaby was played by George Sanders.

A sequel, Children of the Damned (1964), followed, as did a remake, also called Village of the Damned (1995).

Plot
The inhabitants of the British village of Midwich suddenly fall unconscious, as does anyone entering the village. The military establishes a cordon around Midwich and sends in a man wearing a gas mask, but he, too, falls unconscious and is pulled back with rope. The man awakens and reports experiencing a cold sensation just before passing out. The pilot of a military reconnaissance plane is contacted and asked to investigate. When he flies below 5,000 feet, he loses consciousness and the plane crashes. A five-mile exclusion zone around the village is established for all aircraft. After approximately four hours, the villagers regain consciousness, and all are apparently unaffected.

Two months later, all women and girls of child-bearing age in the affected area are discovered to be pregnant, sparking many accusations of both infidelity and extramarital sex. The accusations fade as the extraordinary nature of the pregnancies is discovered, with seven-month fetuses appearing after only five months. All the women give birth on the same day. Their children have an unusual appearance, including "arresting" eyes, odd scalp hair construction and colour (platinum blonde), and unusually narrow fingernails. As the children grow and develop at a rapid rate, it becomes clear they also have a powerful telepathic bond with one another. They can communicate with each other over great distances, and as one learns something, so do the others.

Three years later, Professor Gordon Zellaby (Sanders), whose wife Anthea (Shelley) gave birth to one of the children, attends a meeting with British Intelligence to discuss the children. There he learns Midwich was not the only place affected; follow-up investigations have revealed similar phenomena in other areas of the world.

At age three, the children are precocious, physically and mentally the equivalent of children four times their age. Their behaviour has become even more unusual and striking. They dress impeccably, always walk as a group, speak in an adult manner, and behave maturely, but they show no conscience or love, and demonstrate a coldness to others, causing the villagers to fear and be repulsed by them.

The children begin to exhibit the power to read minds and to force people to do things against their will. There have been a number of villagers' deaths since the children were born, many of which are considered unusual, and some citizens believe the children are responsible. This is confirmed when the children are seen killing a man by making him crash his car into a wall, and again when they force his suspicious brother to shoot himself.

Zellaby, whose "son" David is one of the children, is at first eager to work with them, trying to teach them while hoping to learn more about them. The children are placed in a separate building where they will learn and live. While the children continue to exert their will, Zellaby is informed that the Soviet government has fired a nuclear shell and destroyed the Russian village that was the only other location on Earth where mutant children still lived.

Zellaby compares the children's resistance to reasoning with a brick wall and uses this motif as self-protection against their mind reading after the children's inhuman nature becomes clear to him. He takes a hidden time-bomb to a session with the children and tries to block their awareness of the bomb by visualizing a brick wall. David scans his mind, showing an emotion (astonishment) for the first time. The children eventually manage to break down Zellaby's mental wall and discover the truth just a moment before the bomb detonates, consuming the building in flames and killing everyone in the house, including Zellaby.

Cast

 George Sanders as Gordon Zellaby
 Barbara Shelley as Anthea Zellaby
 Martin Stephens as David Zellaby
 Michael Gwynn as Alan Bernard
 Laurence Naismith as Doctor Willers
 Richard Warner as Mr. Harrington
 Jenny Laird as Mrs. Harrington
 Sarah Long as Evelyn Harrington
 Thomas Heathcote as James Pawle
 Denis Gilmore as Keith Harrington (uncredited)

 Charlotte Mitchell as Janet Pawle
 Pamela Buck as Milly Hughes
 Rosamund Greenwood as Miss Ogle
 Susan Richards as Mrs. Plumpton
 Bernard Archard as Vicar
 Peter Vaughan as P.C. Gobby
 John Phillips as General Leighton
 Richard Vernon as Sir Edgar Hargraves
 John Stuart as Professor Smith
 Keith Pyott as Dr. Carlisle
 June Cowell as Village Child

Production

Development
Film rights to the novel were bought by MGM in June 1957, prior to the book's publication. Milo Frank was assigned to produce. John Lupton was announced as a possible star.

By December, the title had been changed to Village of the Damned and Russ Tamblyn, who appeared as the lead in MGM's Tom Thumb (1958), was named as a possible star. In January  1958, MGM president Joseph R. Vogel announced the film would be among the movies made by the studio that year. Robert Stevens signed to direct.

The film was originally intended as an American picture, to be filmed at the Metro-Goldwyn-Mayer studios in Culver City. Stirling Silliphant wrote a script and Ronald Colman was contracted for the leading role, but MGM delayed the project, bowing to pressure from religious groups, including the Catholic Legion of Decency, who objected to the depiction of virgin birth and the plot's blasphemous implications. Colman died in May 1958. (His widow, actress Benita Hume, married actor George Sanders in 1959, and Sanders took the role meant for Colman.)

In September 1958, Michael Rennie said he was being considered for the lead. In October, Mel Dinelli was reportedly working on a script. In January 1959, Julia Meade signed to play a lead role.

Move to UK
The film was transferred to the MGM-British Studios. In November 1959, George Sanders was cast in the lead role.

Six weeks before filming was to begin, the project was passed to television director Wolf Rilla. He thought the script by Stirling Silliphant "needed a lot of work to make it realistic. It was written by an American who had not gained a great deal of knowledge concerning English life; it just rang false." Rilla was told he had a weekend to make changes so he and Ronald Kinnoch, now the producer, collaborated. "I still don't think the script was as good as it could have been but there simply wasn't time," said Rilla.

The film had a shooting schedule of six weeks and a budget of £82,000. Most filming took place at MGM's Borehamwood Studio but it was also shot on location in the village of Letchmore Heath, near Watford, approximately 12 miles (20 kilometres) north of London. Local buildings such as The Three Horseshoes Pub and Aldenham School were used during filming.

Rilla used a "very low-key documentary manner. It made, I think, the strange happenings even stranger... the horrors were so much more horrible because they were so much more normal." The blonde wigs that the children wore were padded to give the impression that they had abnormally large heads.

The glowing-eye effect, when the children used their mental powers, was achieved by creating animated overlays of a bright white iris; this created a bright glowing iris with a black pupil when optically printed into the film. This technique was used mostly on freeze-frame shot to create the required effect; the only sequence of live motion processed in this way was the scene in which David tells Alan Bernard to "leave us alone" where the eye effect appears as David speaks. The other time David's eyes go from normal to glowing on screen (after one of the girl children is nearly run down by a car), a two shot of the girl and David, is a composite shot split by a slightly jagged black line; the half with the girl is live motion, and you can see her hair moving in the breeze, whereas the half with David is a freeze frame with the eye effect added.

A similar split screen effect is used during the first scene of a boy and girl using their powers to stop their 'brother' stealing a puzzle box; the close ups of the mother holding the boy as his eyes begin to glow and she turns to look at him are achieved as above this time without a black line separating the freeze frames of the boy from the live motion of the mother. The final effect of the children's eyes zooming out of the flames of their burning school house utilized multiple exposures of a model head with glowing eyes which the camera zoomed in on.

For the original release of the film in Britain, censors removed the glowing eye effects. UK prints without the glowing eyes effects show that during the final sequence, in the close-ups, the kids widen their eyes as they attack Zellaby's mind, unlike the freeze frames with added glowing eyes used in the American prints. Another example is a slight smile that David makes after setting one of the villagers on fire in the UK print; the freeze frames of the American print do not contain such subtle detail. This print also has a credit for being filmed at MGM's British studios that is not on the American prints.

Release

Theatrical release
Given an 'A' certificate by the British censors, the film opened in June 1960 at The Ritz cinema in Leicester Square, London. According to director Wolf Rilla, it soon attracted audiences, and cinema goers queued round the block to see it. In December of the same year it was released New York and Los Angeles; it became a sleeper hit for MGM in the US.

Home media
MGM first released the VHS format on April 27, 1995. The film was also released on DVD by Warner Home Video on August 10, 2004, and on Blu-ray by Warner Archive Collection on July 21, 2018.

Box office
According to MGM records the film earned $1.4 million in the US and Canada and $775,000 elsewhere, resulting in a profit of $860,000. Kine Weekly called it a "money maker" at the British box office in 1960.

Critical reception
The 18 June 1960 edition of The Guardian praised the story as "most ingenious" and Rilla as applying "the right laconic touch." Positive reviews also appeared in The Observer (by C.A. Lejeune): "The further you have moved away from fantasy, the more you will understand its chill"; and The People (by Ernest Betts), "As a horror film with a difference, it'll give you the creeps for 77 minutes." Dilys Powell in The Sunday Times stated on 20 June 1960: "Well made British film: the effective timing, the frightening matter-of-factness of the village setting, most of the acting, and especially the acting of the handsome flaxen-haired children (headed by Martin Stevens) who are the cold villains of the piece."

American critics were also in favour of the film. The Time reviewer called it "one of the neatest little horror pictures produced since Peter Lorre went straight" and questioned the wisdom of MGM's low-profile release strategy. While not willing to call it a horror classic, Howard Thompson of The New York Times wrote, "as a quietly civilized exercise in the fear and power of the unknown this picture is one of the trimmest, most original and serenely unnerving little chillers in a long time." The film received a small but positive mention in the Saturday Review which called it "an absorbing little picture that you may yet be able to find on some double-feature bill." Author and film critic Leonard Maltin gave the film three out of a possible four stars, calling it "[an] eerie, well-made chiller." On Rotten Tomatoes the film has an approval rating of 93% based on 40 reviews with an average rating of 7.6/10. The website's critical consensus reads, "Chilling performances and a restrained, eerie atmosphere make this British horror both an unnerving parable of its era and a timeless classic." The climactic scene in which the children break down Zellaby's mental brick wall is #92 on the Bravo miniseries 100 Scariest Movie Moments.

Sequel and remake
An MGM-British sequel, Children of the Damned, directed by Anton M. Leader, was released in 1964 with a smaller group of six children (each one from a different nation: China, India, Nigeria, the Soviet Union, the United States and the UK). Although their powers are similar, the theme and tone are nearly opposite, with the children in the sequel being portrayed as sympathetic characters.

A US-produced remake was released in 1995 by Universal. Also titled Village of the Damned, the film was directed by John Carpenter and moved to a contemporary time period and an American setting. It was not well received by critics.

See also 

 Stepford Cuckoos

References

Notes

Additional sources

 'Beware the Stare' (2003) BBC Radio 4 Documentary (11/12/03) (Wolf Rilla interview).
 Skyrack Newsletter No. 20 (20 June 1960), at the bottom of page this note: *** Ritz, Leicester Sq. showing VILLAGE OF THE DAMNED (Midwich Cuckoos). Also, No. 10 (1 December 1959), this note: # MGM-British are to make the Midwich Cuckoos with George Sanders. And a short positive review of the film by George Locke in No. 21 (25 July 1960).
  Off air VHS of BBC2 1992 screening without glowing eyes.
  Off air recording of TCM 2009 screening (in 4:3 ratio) with glowing eyes.

External links

 
 
 
 

1960 films
1960 horror films
1960s science fiction horror films
British black-and-white films
British science fiction horror films
Films scored by Ron Goodwin
Films based on science fiction novels
Films based on British novels
Films directed by Wolf Rilla
Metro-Goldwyn-Mayer films
Films with screenplays by Stirling Silliphant
Village of the Damned films
Films shot at MGM-British Studios
1960s English-language films
Films about children
1960s British films